The Sturgeon River is a short river in Thunder Bay District in Northwestern Ontario, Canada.

The similarly named Black Sturgeon River in the area flows to Black Bay, a bay separated from Lake Superior by the Black Bay Peninsula.

See also
List of rivers of Ontario

References

Rivers of Thunder Bay District
Tributaries of Lake Superior